The Op. 30 mazurkas, by Frédéric Chopin, are a set of 4 mazurkas written and published in 1837:
 Mazurka in C minor Op. 30 No. 1
 Mazurka in B minor Op. 30 No. 2 (ends in F-sharp minor) 
 Mazurka in D-flat major Op. 30 No. 3
 Mazurka in C-sharp minor Op. 30 No. 4

References

External links 

Mazurkas by Frédéric Chopin
1837 compositions
Music with dedications